Ur (，) is a commune in the Pyrénées-Orientales department in southern France.

Toponymy 
The name of the village is attested in the form Hur as early as 839 AD, and is of pre-Indo-European origin, coming from the Ur-Or-Ar root - quite common in the Pyrenees - which designates a place where there is a spring or a river; the pre-Celtic root *Ur- still means "water" in Basque. Despite local folklore, there is no known relation to the Biblical city-state of Ur.

Geography 
Ur is located in the canton of Les Pyrénées catalanes and in the arrondissement of Prades. Ur-Les Escaldes station has rail connections to Villefranche-de-Conflent and Latour-de-Carol.

Population

See also
 Communes of the Pyrénées-Orientales department

References

Communes of Pyrénées-Orientales